KXAA (100.3 FM) is a radio station in Cle Elum, Washington, licensed to Divine Mercy Broadcasting.

References

External links

XAA
Kittitas County, Washington
Radio stations established in 1979
1979 establishments in Washington (state)